The 1914 Paris–Roubaix was the 19th edition of the Paris–Roubaix, a classic one-day cycle race in France. The single day event was held on 12 April 1914 and stretched  from Paris to its end in a velodrome in Roubaix. The winner was Charles Crupelandt from France.

Results

References

Paris–Roubaix
1914 in road cycling
1914 in French sport
April 1914 sports events